Lycée de Ville is a French international school in Adonis, Keserwan District, Lebanon. It serves petite section through terminale, the final year of lycée (senior high school).

It was founded in 1995.

Notes

External links
 Lycée de Ville

Keserwan District
French international schools in Lebanon
Educational institutions established in 1995
1995 establishments in Lebanon